Echeandia (common name craglily) is a genus of New World plants in the century plant subfamily within the asparagus family.

Etymology
It is named for Spanish botanist Pedro Gregorio Echeandía (1746–1817). Species in the genus are distributed from the south-western United States south to north-western Argentina, southern Bolivia, and southern Peru.

Description
Echeandia are herbaceous perennials with corms and enlarged storage roots. The narrow leaves are held in basal rosettes. Flowers are in loose racemes and may be yellow, orange, white or cream.

Species
There are about 78 to 90 species in the genus.

References

External links

Asparagaceae genera
Agavoideae